"Single-O" is a song composed by Donald Kahn, with lyrics by Johnny Mercer.

Notable recordings
Ella Fitzgerald - Ella Fitzgerald Sings the Johnny Mercer Songbook (1964)

Songs with lyrics by Johnny Mercer
Year of song missing